Crystal Hall is an indoor arena in Zrenjanin. It has a capacity of 2,800 people.

History
The construction of Crystal Hall began in 2006 and was finished in 2009, for the needs of 2009 Summer Universiade. The construction costs were 720 million Serbian dinars in total, exceeded the original cost projections twice. It is the home arena of basketball club Proleter Zrenjanin.

In 2013, the hall was home venue to the 2013 World Women's Handball Championship.

During 2018 and 2019, the city of Zrenjanin allocated significant investments in equipping the hall, for the needs of FIBA Women's EuroBasket 2019.

See also
 List of indoor arenas in Serbia
 Architecture of Serbia

References

External links
 Hala sportova "Kristalna dvorana" 

Zrenjanin
Indoor arenas in Serbia
Basketball venues in Serbia
Handball venues in Serbia
Buildings and structures in Vojvodina